The prime ministers of Australia have attended a variety of different educational institutions.

Until relatively recently, it was uncommon for prime ministers in Australia to hold a university degree. Out of the first ten prime ministers, only three attended university and only two held degrees. However, nine out of the most recent ten prime ministers have been university graduates. The University of Sydney (eight), the University of Oxford (five), and the University of Melbourne (four) have been the most frequently attended institutions. The vast majority of degrees awarded to future prime ministers were in either arts or law. Only Edmund Barton, Earle Page, and Robert Menzies undertook postgraduate studies that resulted in a substantive master's degree. Six others undertook postgraduate studies in the form of a second bachelor's degree, including four who did so at Oxford University and proceeded to a Master of Arts by seniority. No prime minister has held a substantive doctorate, although Earle Page was a medical doctor. Bob Hawke dropped out of a Ph.D. program.

Many of Australia's early prime ministers had limited formal education and left school at a young age to seek employment. Chris Watson, Andrew Fisher, and Joseph Cook all finished their formal schooling before the age of 13. John McEwen is the most recent prime minister to have had no secondary schooling, while Paul Keating is the most recent to have had no university education. Four early prime ministers were educated entirely outside of Australia – one in New Zealand and three in Great Britain. There has been a relatively even mixture of private schools and government schools, and many prime ministers alternated between the two systems. Only a handful of schools have hosted more than one future prime minister – Melbourne Grammar School (three), Sydney Grammar School (three), Wesley College, Melbourne (two), Abbotsholme College (two) and Sydney Boys High School (two).

List
Note: the University of Oxford awards a Master of Arts by seniority, which is indicated with an asterisk.

See also
 List of presidents of the United States by education
 List of prime ministers of Canada by academic degrees
 List of presidents of the Philippines by education
 List of prime ministers of the United Kingdom by education

References
 

Australia 
Education
Australia education-related lists